Nightlights is the third studio album by contemporary Christian musician Jimmy Needham, released on May 18, 2010.

Track listing

References 

2010 albums
Jimmy Needham albums
Inpop Records albums